The 2015 Torneio Internacional de Natal de Futebol Feminino (also known as the 2015 International Tournament of Natal) was the seventh edition of the Torneio Internacional de Futebol Feminino, an invitational women's football tournament held every December in Brazil. Previously held in the cities of Brasília and São Paulo, 2015 is the first year the tournament was held in Natal. The tournament ran from December 9–20, 2015.

Format
In the first phase, the four teams play each other within the group in a single round. The two teams with the most points earned in the respective group, qualify for the next phase. In the final stage, the first and second teams placed in the Group contest the final. If the match ends in a tie, the team with the best record in the first phase is declared the winner. The third and fourth teams placed in the group contest the third place play-off. If the match ends in a tie, the team with the best record in the first phase is declared the winner.

Venues
All matches took place at Arena das Dunas in Natal.

Squads

 (replacing Croatia)

Group stage
All times are local (UTC−03:00)

Knockout stage
No penalty shoot-out were held. If tied, the team with better group stage record win the match.

Third place match

Final

Final results

Goalscorers
7 goals
  Marta

3 goals
  Andressa
  Beatriz
  Debinha
  Christine Sinclair

2 goals
  Mônica
  Janine Beckie
  Nichelle Prince
  Desirée Monsiváis

1 goal
  Formiga
  Poliana
  Raquel
  Rilany
  Josée Bélanger
  Diana Matheson
  Katie Johnson
  Mónica Ocampo
  Mariah Shade

1 own goal
  Patrice Superville (playing against Mexico)

References

External links
2015 International Tournament of Brasilia on Women's Soccer United

2015 in women's association football
2015 in Brazilian women's football
2015
2015 in Canadian women's soccer
2015–16 in Mexican football
2015 in Trinidad and Tobago sport
December 2015 sports events in Africa
Natal, Rio Grande do Norte